Chloe Papandrea (born September 23, 1994), known professionally as Cxloe (stylized in all caps), is an Australian pop singer from Sydney, New South Wales.

Cxloe's debut single "Tough Love" was released in 2017, and her debut extended play, Heavy, Pt. 1, was released on 16 October 2020. Her musical style incorporates genres such as pop, electropop, and dark pop. Cxloe currently resides in the Northern Beaches, New South Wales, with her fiancé Dan Lakajev.

Career

2014–2019: The X Factor and early singles
Papandrea rose to prominence auditioning for the sixth season of The X Factor in 2014. She managed to reach the home visits stage, where she was eliminated. The following year, she auditioned for a second time, but only managed to reach the Chair Challenge this time round.

She is best known for her breakout single "Show You", which was co-written and produced by Sam Farrar of Maroon 5.

In 2019, she supported Maroon 5 on their Red Pill Blues Tour. and released the singles "I Can't Have Nice Things" and "Low Blow".

2020: Heavy, Pt. 1
On 16 October 2020, Papandrea released her debut EP, Heavy, Pt. 1. The same day, she performed a cover of the Cranberries' song "Zombie" for Triple J's Like a Version segment, alongside a performance of her track "12 Steps".

2021
On 7 May 2021, Papandrea released "Cry & Drive", the lead single from her second release. On 20 August 2021, Papandrea released "Soft Rock"; co-written with Eric Leva in Los Angeles in 2019, CXLOE describes the track in a press statement as chronicling her first heartbreak and channeling "Kelly Clarkson, side fringes, iPods, low rise jeans and Paramore".

In December 2022, Papandrea released "Till the Wheels Fall Off". Written during 2020 during COVID lockdown, according to CXLOE, it's a bit of a "psychotic, obsessive love song, [and] was inspired from a deeply personal relationship."

Personal life
Prior to the COVID-19 pandemic, Papandrea split her time between Sydney, Australia and Los Angeles. Papandrea and her boyfriend of seven years, advertiser Dan Lakajev, moved into a house in the Northern Beaches, Sydney, in early 2020. The pair became engaged on 20 February 2021.

Musical style and influences
Papandrea's musical style has been described as pop, electropop, and dark pop.

Discography

Extended plays

Singles

As lead artist

As featured artist

Concert tours
Cxloe has supported Broods, Carmouflage Rose, King Princess and Maroon 5. In May 2019, she embarked on her own headline tour.

Awards and nominations

Rolling Stone Australia Awards
The Rolling Stone Australia Awards are awarded annually in January or February by the Australian edition of Rolling Stone magazine for outstanding contributions to popular culture in the previous year.

! 
|-
| 2022
| Cxloe
| Rolling Stone Readers' Choice Award
| 
|
|-

References

External links
 
 

1994 births
Living people
Australian women pop singers
Australian women singer-songwriters
Singers from Sydney
21st-century Australian singers
21st-century Australian women singers